Flagelloscypha is a genus of cyphelloid fungi in the family Niaceae. The genus has a widespread distribution and contains an estimated 25 species.

Species

F. abieticol
F. abruptiflagellata
F. aotearoa
F. christinae
F. citrispora
F. coloradensis
F. crassipilata
F. dextrinoidea
F. donkii
F. faginea
F. flagellata
F. fusispora
F. globosa
F. japonica
F. kavinae
F. lachneoides
F. libertiana
F. mairei (Pilát) Knudsen
F. malmei
F. merxmuelleri
F. minutissima
F. montis-anagae
F. oblongispora
F. obovatispora
F. orthospora
F. parasitica
F. pilatii
F. polylepidis
F. pseudopanacis
F. pseudopanax
F. punctiformis
F. solenioides
F. subnuda
F. tetraedrispora
F. tongariro
F. trachychaeta
F. venezuelae
F. virginea

See also
List of Agaricales genera

References

External links

Niaceae
Agaricales genera